The 2011–12 EHF Women's Champions League was the nineteenth edition of the EHF Women's Champions League, the top continental handball event for club teams in Europe, organized and supervised by the European Handball Federation. Larvik HK entered the competition as title holders after beating SD Itxako in past season's final.

Budućnost Podgorica won the title for the first time by defeating Győri Audi ETO KC in the big final.

Overview

Format change
Following the decision of the Executive Committee of the European Handball Federation in April 2011, the system of the EHF Women's Champions League qualifying tournaments have changed. Starting from this season, the second qualification tournaments will be played under a final four format, with the semifinals held on a Saturday while the final on the following day. The winners of each tournaments will qualify for the group stage. The method of the first qualification round did not change. In addition, unlike in previous years, clubs that are eliminated during the qualifying phase will directly go to the EHF Women's Cup Winners' Cup.

Team allocation
A total of 32 teams participated in the 2011–12 EHF Champions League from 23 federations. Places were distributed according to the EHF league coefficient, which took into account the performances in European competitions from 2007–08 to 2009–10. Norway have been awarded an additional entry as the title holder country.

Round and draw dates
All draws will be held at the EHF headquarters in Vienna, Austria.

Qualifying rounds 
The draw for both qualifying tournaments took place on 27 June 2011 in Vienna. The rights to organize and host the group matches were also decided in this draw.

Qualification Tournaments 1 
In the first stage of the qualifying process eight clubs were drawn into two groups of four. The sides played against each other once and the top two teams of each group advanced to the second qualifying phase, where they were classified automatically into the fourth pot. The four losing teams entered the 2011–12 EHF Cup Winners' Cup second round.

Seedings

Group A 
The tournament was organised by the Greek club AC Ormi-Loux Patras.

Group B 
The tournament was organised by the Slovakian side HK IUVENTA Michalovce.

Qualification Tournaments 2 
Sixteen clubs were set to participate in the second qualifying stage, divided into four groups of four. For the first time in the competition's history, a final four format was used to determine the group winners, that were qualified for the Group matches. According to the seeding list, teams in Pot 1 were drawn together with Pot 4 sides, while clubs from Pot 2 met Pot 3 teams in the semifinals of the tournaments. However, as stated in the EHF regulations, clubs from the same federation enjoyed protection and could not be selected into the same group. Teams that finished bottom of their respective groups went to the second round of the 2011–12 EHF Cup Winners' Cup, while second and third placed teams joined that competition in the third round.

Seedings

Group 1 
The tournament was organised by the Danish club Viborg HK.

Bracket

Semifinals

Third place match

Final

Group 2 
The tournament was organised by the Macedonian club ŽRK Metalurg.

Bracket

Semifinals

Third place match

Final

Group 3 
The tournament was organised by the Polish club Zagłębie Lubin.

Bracket

Semifinals

Third place match

Final

Group 4 
The tournament was organised by the Swedish club IK Sävehof.

Bracket

Semifinals

Third place match

Final

Group matches

The draw of the group matches was held on June 28 at the Gartenhotel Altmannsdorf in Vienna. A total of sixteen teams were concerned in the process, having divided into four pots of four. Similar to the qualifying phase, clubs from the same country could not been drawn into the same group, therefore, instead of direct draw, Pot 4 teams were allocated to the first possible position from Group A to Group D.

Seedings

Group A

Group B

Group C

Group D

Main round

The draw of the main round was held on November 15 at the Gartenhotel Altmannsdorf in Vienna. A total of eight teams advanced from the group stage to the main round and were located in two pots, with the group winners being in Pot 1 and the runners-up in Pot 2. Teams from the same groups at the group stage were not able to be drawn together.

Seedings

Group 1

Group 2

Knockout stage

Semifinals

|}

Final

|}

Top scorers 

Final statistics

Notes

References

External links

 
Women's EHF Champions League
EHF
EHF